Margaret Leung Ko May-yee, SBS, JP (born 1952 in Hong Kong) is a non-official member of the Executive Council of Hong Kong. She was previously the deputy chairman and managing director of Chong Hing Bank Limited and vice-chairman and chief executive officer of Hang Seng Bank Limited. And before that she was the group general manager and Global Co-head of commercial banking of HSBC.

Biography 
1952: Born in Hong Kong
1978: Graduated from the University of Hong Kong in Economics, Accounting and Business Administration
1981: Joined HSBC
2005: Appointed to Group general manager and Global Co-head of Commercial banking of HSBC
2009: Appointed to vice-chairman and chief executive officer of Hang Seng Bank, replacing Raymond Or
2014: Appointed to Deputy chairman and managing director of Chong Hing Bank Limited.
2022: Appointed as the non-official member of the Executive Council of Hong Kong
Leung declared herself as a member of the Hong Kong Golf Club on 17 August 2022, adding it after her initial declaration of interests.

See also
Women in business

References

1952 births
Living people
Alumni of the University of Hong Kong
Hong Kong bankers
Hong Kong chief executives
Hang Seng Bank
HSBC people
Hong Kong financial businesspeople
Recipients of the Silver Bauhinia Star
Members of the Executive Council of Hong Kong